The De La Salle Zobel Symphony Orchestra (DLSZ Symphony) is an 80-member orchestra that is based in De La Salle-Santiago Zobel School in Muntinlupa, Philippines.  Its current conductor and orchestral arranger is Leopoldo F. Sumera, Jr.

History 

The DLSZ Symphony was formed in 1984 as an informal musical group, at the urging of Br. Raymond Bronowicz FSC, who was the Director of De La Salle-Santiago Zobel at that time and was tasked to play at important school functions and gatherings.  After a few years, it was formally organized into an orchestra by Maestro Leoncio Molino.  Since then, it has been known as the DLSZ Symphony Orchestra.

Past Conductors 

 Leoncio Molino
 Aguedo Malabanan 
 Ryan Hernandez
 Gerardo Fajardo (2003–2004)
 Tom Nazareno (2003–2005)

Assistant Conductors 

The Bandleader of the DLSZ Symphonic Band is concurrently the Assistant Conductor of the Symphony Orchestra.  Past Assistant Conductors include:

 Rodolfo Bangco, Jr.
 Emmanuel Lalunio (2002–2003)
 Tom Nazareno (2003, 2004)
 Melvin Rioveros (2005–2007)
 Nena Chavez (2007–present)
 Linwell Lalic (2010–present)

Composition 

The DLSZ Symphony Orchestra is composed of the following sections:
 Woodwinds
 Brasses
 Percussion
 Strings

The Orchestra has also been broken into the winds and strings sections to make up a symphonic band and string ensemble, respectively.

Membership 

Membership to the Orchestra is open to all grade school and high school students of the school who have been members of the DLSZ Beginning Band or the DLSZ Beginning Strings.  These two groups train grade school students in their preferred musical instrument and prepares them for subsequent membership to the Symphony Orchestra.

Performances 

The repertoire of the Orchestra mostly consists of classical pieces complemented by contemporary and popular music.

At present, the Orchestra continues to perform its original mandate of providing music for special events that are held on campus.  It also plays at concerts during De La Salle Zobel's anniversary celebrations in November and at Christmas.  Prior to the establishment of the school's Center for the Performing Arts, the Orchestra held a year-end concert in March.  This has since been replaced by the Center's annual Performing Arts Festival in February, which also features the other performing groups of the school such as the DLSZ Chorale and the Rondalla Ensemble.

Up until 2000, when the school presented annual musicals at theaters off campus, the Orchestra provided live music to the school plays.  The last musical to be performed outside of the campus was Teach the World, a play, which was based on the life and times of St. John Baptist De La Salle.  In 2004, during the 25th-anniversary celebrations of De La Salle Zobel, the Orchestra once again provided music to Act 25, which was a revue of the past productions of the school.

Besides performing at Lasallian schools in the Philippines, the DLSZ Symphony has also been invited to perform in other schools around Metro Manila. Recently, they were invited by Office of the Speaker Judith T, Won Pat in Guam's Performing Arts Festival

Its rehearsal hall is located at the ground floor of De La Salle Zobel's Angelo King Center for the Performing Arts.

Notes 

Filipino orchestras
Musical groups from Metro Manila
Musical groups established in 1984